Moran is a unisex given name. In Hebrew it refers to the viburnum plant.

 Moran Atias (born 1981), Israeli actress
 Moran Doc Boggs (1898-1971), American singer, songwriter and banjo player
 Moran Buzovski (born 1992), Israeli rhythmic gymnast
 Moran Fridman (born 1990), Israeli footballer
 Moran Lavi (born 1983), Israeli footballer
 Moran Mazor (born 1991), Israeli singer
 Moran Roth (born 1982), Israeli basketball player
 Moran Samuel (born 1982), Israeli paralympic basketball player and world champion rower
 Moran Sarkar, Indian dancer who married Maharaja Ranjit Singh of Punjab in 1802

See also
 Edward James Moran Campbell (1925–2004), Canadian physician and academic
 Torrance Moran Norris (born 1978), American former National Football League player

Unisex given names